Ibero Cruises was a British-American and Spanish owned cruise line based in Madrid, Spain.  The cruise line was aimed at the Spanish and Portuguese speaking markets. Iberocruceros operated voyages from Europe, the Mediterranean, and South America.

History

The company was founded in 2003 as Viajes Iberojet and renamed in 2007 and became a joint subsidiary of Carnival Corporation & plc and Orizonia Corporation, under the executive control of Costa Cruises Group, Carnival Corporation's European division.

It was announced in November 2014, that Costa Cruises would absorb Ibero Cruises in its entirety by the end of the year. The Grand Celebration would be transferred to the main fleet of Costa Crociere as the Costa Celebration. Also the Grand Holiday would be transferred to the British Cruise & Maritime Voyages as the Magellan.

Former fleet

References

External links 

 Iberocuceros Official website (Defunct) 
 Iberocuceros Official website (via the Web Archive) 

Carnival Corporation & plc
Defunct cruise lines
Transport companies established in 2007
Transport companies disestablished in 2014